Soi Dao may refer to:

 Soi Dao district, a district (amphoe) in Chanthaburi Province, Thailand
 Phu Soi Dao, a mountain between Thailand and Laos
Phu Soi Dao National Park, a national park in Thailand covering the area
 Khao Soi Dao Nuea or Khao Soi Dao Tai, mountain peaks in Khao Soi Dao Wildlife Sanctuary